Tethyidae is a family of sea sponges belonging to the order Tethyida.

References
Tethyidae at Encyclopedia of Life

Hadromerida